Yom tov sheni shel galuyot, also called in short yom tov sheni, means "the second festival day in the Diaspora", and is an important concept in halakha (Jewish law). The concept refers to the observance of an extra day of Jewish holidays outside of the Land of Israel.

Yom tov sheni was established as a gezera (rabbinic law) by the rabbis of the Sanhedrin in the Second Temple period, approximately 2,000 years ago, and is observed to this day by Orthodox and Conservative Jews.  Reform Judaism abolished it in 1846, and Reconstructionist Judaism also largely did the same.

In Jewish sources 
The need for a second festival day arises from problems encountered by Jews living in the Diaspora following the Babylonian exile. The Jewish calendar is a lunar system with months of 29 or 30 days. In Temple times, the length of the month depended on witnesses who had seen the new moon coming to the Temple in Jerusalem. Following confirmation of their evidence, a new Jewish month would be proclaimed. News of this proclamation was subsequently sent out to all Jewish communities. If no witnesses arrived, the new month was proclaimed the following day. Those communities who didn't receive word of the precise date of the beginning of the new month by the time of a festival, would keep the festival for two days, to account for the eventuality the new month wasn't proclaimed only the following day.

Later (by Hillel II, according to tradition), the Jewish calendar was fixed. Instead of the new month being determined by observation of the moon in Jerusalem, the calendar was fixed so that new months could be calculated ahead of time by anyone. This eliminated the uncertainty of those who lived far from Jerusalem about the dating of holidays. Nevertheless, rabbinic authorities decreed that Diaspora communities continue to observe two days of holidays, for two reasons: to preserve their ancestral custom; and out of fear that the non-Jewish authorities might prohibit Torah study and Diaspora Jews would no longer know how to reliably calculate the calendar.

Observance 
The second day is observed for all Biblically ordained festivals, with exceptions (see below). Thus, Shavuot is one day in the Land of Israel and two days in the Diaspora. Pesach is a seven-day festival in the Land of Israel, the first and last days of which are holy days, with five days of Chol HaMoed in between. In the Diaspora, it is an eight-day festival, with a pair of holy days at the start and finish, and four days Chol HaMoed. 

Sukkot is a seven-day festival in the Land of Israel, the first day of which is a holy day, followed by six days of Chol Hamoed. These are, in turn, followed immediately on the eighth day by the separate-but-related holy day of Shemini Atzeret. In the Diaspora, the first two days are holy days, and are followed by five days of Chol Hamoed. These are in turn followed by two holy days of Shemini Atzeret. However, in the Diaspora, the name "Shemini Atzeret" is usually used only to refer to the first of the two days; the second day is called Simchat Torah.

There are two exceptions to the rule. The fast day of Yom Kippur, which is one day even in the Diaspora, due to the difficulty of a two-day fast. Also, Rosh Hashanah is two days even in the Land of Israel, because it falls on the first day of the month; thus, even people living in the Land of Israel would not find out the correct day until after the holiday. Conservative Judaism uniformly observes two days of Rosh Hashanah as well, as do some Reform congregations.

See also
 Isru chag refers to the day after each of the Three Pilgrimage Festivals.
 Chol HaMoed, the intermediate days of Passover and Sukkot.
 Mimouna, a traditional North African Jewish celebration held the day after Passover.
 Pesach Sheni, is exactly one month after 14 Nisan.
 Purim Katan is when during a Jewish leap year Purim is celebrated during Adar II so that the 14th of Adar I is then called Purim Katan.
 Shushan Purim falls on Adar 15 and is the day on which Jews in Jerusalem celebrate Purim.
 Yom Kippur Katan is a practice observed by some Jews on the day preceding each Rosh Chodesh or New-Moon Day.

Bibliography 
 Zimmels, Hirsch Jakob, "The Controversy about the Second Day of the Festival," in Samuel Belkin, ed., Abraham Weiss Jubilee Volume (New York, 1964), 139-168.
 Jacob Katz, "The Orthodox Defense of the Second Day of the Festivals," Divine Law in Human Hands: Case Studies in Halakhic Flexibility (Jerusalem: Hebrew University Magnes Press, 1998), 255-319
  David Yerachmiel Fried, Yom tov sheni kehilkhato Jerusalem 5748 (1988) (Hebrew)
  
 Kaufmann Kohler & W. Wilner, "Second day of festivals" Jewish Encyclopedia, 1906

Notes and references 

Hebrew names of Jewish holy days
Jewish diaspora
Jewish law
Nisan observances
Passover
Shavuot
Shemini Atzeret
Sukkot
Tishrei observances
Hebrew words and phrases in Jewish law